Hay Meadow Creek is a stream in the U.S. state of Wisconsin.

Hay Meadow Creek was previously known as "Willow Creek"; the present name was adopted in the 1840s as "Sheritts Hay Meadow Creek".

References

Rivers of Wisconsin
Rivers of Portage County, Wisconsin